The Malawi Women's League called also Elite Women's League is the top flight of women's association football in Malawi. The competition is run by the National Women's Football Association which is a member association of the Football Association of Malawi.

History
Women's football was founded in 1998 in Blantyre. It was formed on first, a Blantyre Women's District League which later had becomes a Blantyre Women's Regional League and layer introduced in other regions. On 2020 was started the first Malawi women's League which is composed of three regions of height teams each who will split into Regional and National phases.

References

External links 
 Women's Football - fam.mw

Women's association football leagues in Africa
Football competitions in Malawi
Women
2004 establishments in Malawi
Sports leagues established in 2004
Women's sport in Malawi